Alse Young (1615 – 26 May 1647) of Windsor, Connecticut — sometimes Achsah Young or Alice Young — was the first recorded instance of execution for witchcraft in the thirteen American colonies. She had one child, Alice Beamon (Young), born in 1640, who was also condemned for the same crime thirty years later in the 1670s, but was not hanged.

Background and execution

Alse Young was born in 1615 in New Windsor, Berkshire, England and moved to Windsor, Connecticut during the 1630s. She is believed to have been the wife of John Young, who bought a small parcel of land in Windsor in 1641, sold it in 1649, and then disappeared from the town records. The best evidence to suggest that John Young was her husband comes from a physician. She had a daughter, Alice Young Beamon, who was accused of witchcraft in nearby Springfield, Massachusetts, some 30 years later. Her daughter Alice Young Beamon married and had children with Simon Beamon. Similarly to her mother, Alice Young Beamon was also accused of witchcraft but defended herself by claiming that she was being slandered. Even though Alice Young was a woman without a son when the witchcraft accusation was lodged, her husband was still alive during her accusation. This makes it unlikely that she was accused simply for the possibility of inheriting her husband's estate in the future. Other reasons are more probable.

There is no record of Young's trial or the specifics of the charge. The same year that Alice was hanged the death rate had steadily increased. The influenza affected everyone in that even wealthy people with more resources and access to medical care were dying at extremely high rates. Many prominent members of the noble class and legislature lost their families. Given such circumstances, a member of the elite class may have organized for someone to be hanged and scapegoated, leading to Alice's being chosen at random. She may have been hanged at the Meeting House Square in Hartford, Connecticut, now the site of the Old State House, since a jail was on the edge of the square. A journal of then Massachusetts Bay Colony Governor John Winthrop mentions "One... of Windsor arraigned and executed at Hartford for a witch." The second town clerk of Windsor, Matthew Grant, confirms her execution with the May 26, 1647, diary entry, "Alse Young was hanged." She was roughly 32 years old when she was hanged.

Exoneration 
At the urging of Beth Caruso, a local historian who wrote a book on her case, Alse Young was formally exonerated on February 6, 2017, by a unanimous vote of the Windsor Town Council, along with Lydia Gilbert, the second Connecticut woman to be executed for witchcraft, who was also from Windsor.

See also 
 Connecticut Witch Trials
 Capital punishment in Connecticut
 Capital punishment in the United States
 List of people executed in Connecticut
 List of people executed for witchcraft

References

Further reading
 David D. Hall, (editor), Witch-Hunting in Seventeenth Century New England, Boston: Northeastern University Press, 1999, 
 John Demos, Entertaining Satan: witchcraft and the culture of early New England, Oxford University Press, 1982, pp. 346–347.
 John M. Taylor, The Witchcraft Delusion In Colonial Connecticut (1647-1697), online at Project Gutenberg.
 Annie Eliot Trumbull, "One Blank of Windsor", Literary Section, Hartford Courant, December 3, 1904.
 Beth M Caruso, One of Windsor: The Untold Story of America's First Witch Hanging, Hartford: Lady Slipper Press, 2015, 
 Windsor Community Television, Alse Young's Final Journey, December 1, 2016.
 John Winthrop's Journal (1630-1647) Volume 1 of 2 - Read Free Online at: https://dl.tufts.edu/concern/pdfs/8910k580w 
 John Winthrop's Journal (1630-1647) Volume 2 of 2 - Read Free Online at: https://dl.tufts.edu/concern/pdfs/th83m8944

External links
 Alse Young profile, damnedct.com; accessed December 26, 2014.
 Witches and Witchcraft at the Connecticut Judicial Branch Library, jud.ct.gov; accessed December 26, 2014.
 Alse Young - The Grimm Generation, Soundcloud, accessed February 27, 2017

1600s births
1647 deaths
17th-century executions of American people
American people executed for witchcraft
Executed people from Connecticut
History of Hartford, Connecticut
People executed by Connecticut by hanging
People executed by Connecticut Colony
People executed by the Thirteen Colonies by hanging
People from Windsor, Connecticut
People of colonial Connecticut
Place of birth unknown
Year of birth uncertain
Year of birth unknown